Wasfi Jabbar (born 1 July 1964) is a former Iraqi football goalkeeper who played for Iraq at the 1988 Arab Nations Cup. 

Jabbar played for Iraq between 1983 and 1988.

References

Iraqi footballers
Iraq international footballers
Living people
Association football goalkeepers
1964 births